Dietel is a surname. Notable people with the surname include:

People 
 Paul Dietel (1860–1947), German mycologist
 Heinrich Gotthold Dietel (1839–1911), German textile industry entrepreneur
 Dietel Palace, a neo-baroque palace built in Sosnowiec (Poland)
 Andreas Dietel (born 1959), German speed skater
 Rainer Dietel (born 1937), German skier
 Johann Ludwig Dietel, transcriber of the Dietel manuscript